The referendum on the law-making powers of the National Assembly for Wales was a non-binding referendum held in Wales on 3 March 2011 on whether the National Assembly for Wales should have full law-making powers in the twenty subject areas where it has jurisdiction. The referendum asked the question: ‘Do you want the Assembly now to be able to make laws on all matters in the 20 subject areas it has powers for?’

If a majority voted 'yes', the Assembly would then be able to make laws, known as Acts of the Assembly, on all matters in the subject areas, without needing the UK Parliament's agreement. If a majority voted 'no', the arrangements at the time of the referendum would have continued – that is, in each devolved area, the Assembly would be able to make its own laws on some matters, but not others. To make laws on any of these other matters, the Assembly would have had to ask the UK Parliament to transfer the powers to it. Regulations for the referendum, and the powers to be approved or rejected by it, were provided for in the Government of Wales Act 2006.

The results of the referendum were announced on 4 March 2011.  Overall, 63.49% voted 'yes', and 36.51% voted 'no'.  In 21 of 22 local authorities the vote was 'yes', with the exception being Monmouthshire by a slim majority.   The overall turnout was 35.2%. First Minister Carwyn Jones, welcoming the result, said: "Today an old nation came of age."

Background
In the One Wales coalition agreement on 27 June 2007, Welsh Labour and Plaid Cymru made the commitment "to proceed to a successful outcome of a referendum for full law-making powers under Part IV of the Government of Wales Act 2006 as soon as practicable, at or before the end of the Assembly term". The two parties agreed "in good faith to campaign for a successful outcome to such a referendum" and to set up an All-Wales Convention to prepare for such a successful outcome.

On 27 October 2007 the then First Minister Rhodri Morgan and the Deputy First Minister Ieuan Wyn Jones appointed Sir Emyr Jones Parry, the recently retired Permanent Representative from Britain to the United Nations to head the convention.   Sir Emyr stated on 22 November 2007 that he would like to begin to work as soon as possible and hoped to have the report ready by 2009 at the latest.

The All Wales Convention reported to the First Minister and the Deputy First Minister on 18 November 2009. It reported that a "yes" vote would be obtainable but not guaranteed. An opinion poll for the convention had found that 47% would vote Yes, and 37% would vote No. The report suggested that the Assembly needed to decide before June 2010 whether to trigger a referendum if the vote was to be held before the next Assembly elections.

On 2 February 2010 the new First Minister Carwyn Jones, who had succeeded Rhodri Morgan on 9 December 2009, confirmed that a trigger vote would be held on 9 February on whether the Assembly should request a referendum on full law making powers. The Welsh Liberal Democrats and Welsh Conservatives stated they did not want the referendum to be held on the same day as the 2011 Assembly elections and would abstain from voting to trigger the referendum if this date was not ruled out. The trigger vote was held in the Assembly on Tuesday 9 February 2010, and was approved unanimously across all parties, with 53 out of the 60 AMs voting for it. Under the Government of Wales Act 2006 the First Minister was required to send a letter within two weeks to the Welsh Secretary (then Peter Hain), who would then have 120 days to lay a draft order for a referendum before Parliament. It was expected that the referendum date would not be set until after the general election.

On 15 June 2010 Cheryl Gillan, the new Welsh Secretary in the Conservative–Liberal Democrat coalition government at Westminster, announced that the referendum would probably be held between January and March 2011. Others proposed that it should be held on 5 May 2011, together with both the Assembly elections and the AV referendum. It was agreed that the referendum be held on 3 March 2011, after representations to the Welsh Secretary from the Welsh Government.

Referendum question

Draft question

The draft referendum question submitted by the Welsh Secretary to the Electoral Commission on 23 June 2010 was:

This wording was, however, criticised by the Welsh Government.

Revised question
A revised question was released in September 2010:

permitting a simple YES / NO answer (to be marked with a single (X)).

Opinion polls and comments
In 2007, one poll suggested that 47% might say Yes in a referendum vote, with 44% against.  A poll in February 2008 saw 49% in favour of a full law-making parliament and 41% against. On 3 February 2010 the Western Mail endorsed the Yes campaign.  A BBC poll released on 1 March 2010 (St. David's Day) found that support had risen for full law making powers, up to 56%, with 35% against, although Welsh Conservative leader Nick Bourne (who supported a yes vote) was sceptical of the poll results.

A summary table of poll results in advance of the referendum is set out below.

Overall result

The results were counted and announced the following day on Friday 4 March 2011, locally initially with the final result declared at the Senedd in Cardiff by the Chair of the Electoral Commission Jenny Watson who announced the result in both Welsh and English.

In 21 of 22 unitary authorities, the vote was Yes. The only counting area to declare a No result was Monmouthshire, which was announced following a recount. The difference was only 320 votes.

Results by council areas

Turnout was highest in Carmarthenshire (44.36%) and lowest in Wrexham (27.04%). The highest percentage of Yes votes was in Gwynedd (76.03% Yes) and the highest percentage of No votes was in Monmouthshire (50.64% No).

Reactions to the result
First Minister Carwyn Jones said: "Today an old nation came of age."

Deputy First Minister and Plaid Cymru leader Ieuan Wyn Jones said that it marked "the beginning of a new era of Welsh devolution - the decade to deliver for Wales. ... To demand respect, you must first display self-respect. Today we have done just that, and the rest of the world can now sit up and take notice of the fact that our small nation, here on the western edge of the continent of Europe, has demonstrated pride in who we are, and what we all stand for."

Kirsty Williams, leader of the Welsh Liberal Democrats, said that the referendum showed that people "wanted to endorse and strengthen devolution", but they "also want it to work better". She said that voters were right to show "widespread dissatisfaction" with the Welsh Government's performance.

Welsh Secretary Cheryl Gillan, a member of the Conservative Party, said that there had been concern over turnout, but called it "a good day for Wales". She said that the UK Government would reinforce its commitment to make the arrangements work effectively.

Roger Lewis, Chairman of the Yes for Wales campaign, said he was delighted, adding: "It is clear, the people of Wales have spoken."

Rachel Banner, of the No campaign, said that it marked a "turning point for our nation". She questioned the legitimacy of the result, asking: "Has it got the full-hearted consent of the Welsh people?" She also stated that she did not believe that the 42 backbench members of the Assembly could provide high-quality scrutiny of the activities of the Welsh Government.

See also
 Yes for Wales
 Commission on Scottish Devolution
 Referendums in the United Kingdom
 Welsh Devolution

References

External links
Official website of the "YES" campaign "Yes for Wales"
Official website of the "YES" campaign "Tomorrow's Wales"
Official website of the "NO" campaign "True Wales"
Official website of the "NO" campaign by "Mark Beech"
Electoral Commission webpage on the referendum
Government of Wales Act 2006 (full text)
 BBC News: Wales Referendum 2011
BBC News, Roger Scully, What will Wales powers referendum result mean?, 28 February 2011

Referendums in Wales
2011 elections in the United Kingdom
2011 referendums
2011 in Wales
2010s elections in Wales
Senedd
Welsh devolution
Autonomy referendums
March 2011 events in the United Kingdom